is a railway station in the city of Toyokawa, Aichi, Japan, operated by Meitetsu.

Lines

Station layout
The station has one elevated island platform with the station building underneath. The station has automated ticket machines, Manaca automated turnstiles and is unattended.

Platforms

Adjacent stations

Station history
Yawata Station was opened on February 18, 1945.

Passenger statistics
In fiscal 2017, the station was used by an average of 1089 passengers daily.

Surrounding area
 Toyokawa Industrial Park
Toyokawa City Hospital

See also
 List of Railway Stations in Japan

References

External links

 Official web page 

Railway stations in Japan opened in 1972
Railway stations in Aichi Prefecture
Stations of Nagoya Railroad
Toyokawa, Aichi